Igor Kolaković (Игор Колаковић; born 4 June 1965) is a Montenegrin professional volleyball coach and former player. He currently serves as head coach for the Serbia national team.

Personal life
Igor's wife, Sandra, is a former handball national team player, former head coach of the Serbia women's national handball team. Igor received a bachelor's degree of business administration in 1989 at the University of Montenegro. Aleksa Kolaković, son of Igor, is a handball player.

Career

As a player
Kolakovic played as a setter for Budućnost Podgorica and Partizan Beograd from 1979 to 1997, after which he became a head coach of the Podgorica team. He is two–time Yugoslavian Champion and two–time Yugoslavian Cup winner.

As a coach
Igor Kolakovic replaced Ljubomir Travica as head coach of the Serbia men's national volleyball team ahead of the 2006 FIVB World Championship, after assisting him for three years. He was the head coach of the Serbian national volleyball team from 2006 until 2014. He led Serbia to a gold medal at the 2011 European Championship and bronze in 2007 and 2013. In 2010, he achieved a great success at the 2010 World Championship winning a bronze medal. He helped his team win two silver medals at the 2008 and 2009 World League and a bronze one at the 2010. In 2014, he resigned his post as the head coach of Serbia after eight years. At the professional club level, he won, among others, two titles of the Montenegrin Champion in 2007 and 2008 with Budućnost Podgorica, and two titles of the Slovenian Champion in 2011 and 2012 with ACH Volley. In 2017, he was appointed as a new head coach of the Iranian national volleyball team. He led Iran to a bronze medal of the 2017 World Grand Champions Cup, defeating, among others, teams of USA, France and Italy. In 2019, Iran, led by him, won its 3rd Asian Champion title. In 2020, he was dismissed as the head coach of Iran.

Honours

As a player
 CEV Challenge Cup
  1989/1990 – with Partizan Beograd

 National championships
 1988/1989  Yugoslavian Cup, with Partizan Beograd
 1989/1990  Yugoslavian Cup, with Partizan Beograd
 1989/1990  Yugoslavian Championship, with Partizan Beograd
 1990/1991  Yugoslavian Championship, with Partizan Beograd

As a coach
 National championships
 2000/2001  Serbia and Montenegro Cup, with Budućnost Podgorica
 2001/2002  Serbia and Montenegro Championship, with Budućnost Podgorica
 2004/2005  Serbia and Montenegro Cup, with Budućnost Podgorica
 2004/2005  Serbia and Montenegro Championship, with Budućnost Podgorica
 2005/2006  Serbia and Montenegro Cup, with Budućnost Podgorica
 2005/2006  Serbia and Montenegro Championship, with Budućnost Podgorica
 2006/2007  Montenegrin Cup, with Budućnost Podgorica
 2006/2007  Montenegrin Championship, with Budućnost Podgorica
 2007/2008  Montenegrin Cup, with Budućnost Podgorica
 2007/2008  Montenegrin Championship, with Budućnost Podgorica
 2010/2011  Slovenian Cup, with ACH Volley
 2010/2011  Slovenian Championship, with ACH Volley
 2011/2012  Slovenian Cup, with ACH Volley
 2011/2012  Slovenian Championship, with ACH Volley

References

External links

 
 Coach profile at Volleybox.net

1965 births
Living people
Sportspeople from Podgorica
Yugoslav men's volleyball players
Montenegrin men's volleyball players
Volleyball coaches of international teams
Montenegrin expatriate sportspeople in Serbia
Montenegrin expatriate sportspeople in Slovenia
Montenegrin expatriate sportspeople in France
Montenegrin expatriate sportspeople in Iran
Montenegrin expatriate sportspeople in Poland
Warta Zawiercie coaches
Setters (volleyball)